World War II officially ended in Asia on September 2, 1945, with the surrender of Japan on the . Before that, the United States dropped two atomic bombs on Japan, and the Soviet Union declared war on Japan, causing Emperor Hirohito to announce the acceptance of the Potsdam Declaration on August 15, 1945, which would eventually lead to the surrender ceremony on September 2.

After the ceremony, Japanese forces continued to surrender across the Pacific, with the last major surrender occurring on October 25, 1945, with the surrender of Japanese forces in Taiwan to Chiang Kai-shek. The Americans occupied Japan after the end of the war until April 28, 1952, when the Treaty of San Francisco came into effect.

Prelude

Soviet agreements to invade Japan 
At the Tehran Conference, between November 28 and December 1, 1943,  the Soviet Union agreed to invade Japan "after the defeat of Germany", but this would not be finalized until the Yalta Conference between February 4 and February 11, 1945, when the Soviet Union agreed to invade Japan within 2 or 3 months. On April 5, 1945, the Soviet Union denounced the Soviet–Japanese Neutrality Pact that had been signed on April 13, 1941, as now the Soviet Union had plans for war with Japan.

Surrender of Axis forces in Europe 
Japan's biggest allies in Europe began to surrender in 1945, with the last Italian troops surrender in the "Rendition of Caserta" on April 29, 1945, and the Germans surrendering on May 8, 1945, leaving Japan as the last major Axis power standing.

The Potsdam Conference and Declaration 
On July 17, 1945, the Potsdam Conference began. While mostly dealing with events in Europe after the Axis surrenders, the Allies also discussed the war against Japan, leading to the Potsdam Declaration being issued on July 26, 1945, calling for the unconditional surrender of Japan, and "prompt and utter destruction" if Japan failed to surrender. Yet, the ultimatum also claimed that Japan would not "be enslaved as a race or destroyed as a nation".

Japan's peace attempts and response to the Potsdam Declaration

Peace attempts 
Before the Potsdam Declaration was issued, Japan had wanted to attempt peace with the Allies, with some early moves by the government apparent as early as the spring of 1944. By the time the Suzuki cabinet took office on April 7, 1945, it became clear that the government's unannounced aim was to secure peace. The repeated attempts to establish unofficial communication with the Allies included sending Prince Fumimaro Konoe to Moscow to try to get the Soviet Union to make the Americans stop the war. However, the Soviet Union did not want the Allies to have peace with Japan until they declared war on Japan.

Response to the Potsdam Declaration 
When the Potsdam Declaration was issued, Japan's government followed a policy of mokusatsu, which can be roughly translated as "to withhold comment", most likely the closest to what the government meant. However, Japan's propaganda agencies, like Radio Tokyo and the Domei News Agency, broadcast that Japan was "ignoring" the Potsdam Declaration, another possible translation of mokusatsu, making it seem like Japan outright ignored the Potsdam Declaration, leading to the United States dropping nuclear weapons on Japan a few days later.

Final stages

Before the informal surrender of Japan

Atomic bombings of Hiroshima and Nagasaki 

On August 6, 1945, a gun-type nuclear bomb, Little Boy, was dropped on Hiroshima from a special B-29 Superfortress named Enola Gay, flown by Col. Paul Tibbets. It was the first use of atomic weapons in combat. 70,000 were killed instantly; 30,000 more would die by the end of the year. Hiroshima was chosen as the target to demonstrate the destructiveness of the bomb.

After the bombing of Hiroshima, Harry Truman said that "We have spent two billion dollars on the greatest scientific gamble in history—and won." Japan still continued the war, though, despite some officials' attempts to make peace through the Soviets.

On August 9, 1945, a second, and more powerful plutonium implosion atomic bomb, Fat Man, was dropped on Nagasaki from a different Silverplate B-29 named Bockscar, flown by Major General Charles Sweeney. The original target was Kokura, but thick clouds covered the city, so the plane was flown to the secondary target, Nagasaki, instead. It killed 40,000 instantly, and another 30,000 would die by the end of the year.

The atomic bombings were one possible reason why Emperor Hirohito decided to surrender to the Allies.

Soviet war against Japan 
On August 8, 1945, the Soviet Union declared war on Japan, breaking the Soviet–Japanese Neutrality Pact This dashed any hopes of peace negotiated through the Soviet Union and was a big factor in the surrender of Japan The next day after, Soviet armies invaded Manchuria, attacking from all sides, except the south. On August 10, 1945, Soviet forces invaded Karafuto Prefecture. Following the declaration, Japan was at war with almost all non-neutral nations.

Korea 
On August 11, 1945, with the drafting of General Order No. 1, the 38th Parallel was set as the delineation between the Soviet and US occupation zones in Korea, with Japanese forces north the parallel surrendering to the Soviets, and south of it surrendering to the Americans.

The informal Japanese surrender 
On August 9, after the Nagasaki atomic bombing, shortly before midnight, Hirohito entered a meeting with his cabinet, where he said that he did not believe Japan could continue to fight the war. The next day, the Japanese Foreign Ministry transmitted to the Allies that they would accept the Potsdam Declaration. In the evening of August 14, Hirohito was recorded accepting the Potsdam Declaration at the NHK broadcasting studio. It would not be broadcast until the next day at noon.

After the informal surrender

Douglas MacArthur 
General Douglas MacArthur was the Supreme Commander for the Allied Powers, and as such had complete control over the occupation of Japan. He issued General Order No. 1 on August 17, which ordered all Japanese forces to unconditionally surrender to an Allied power in the Pacific, depending on the location. On August 30, General Douglas MacArthur arrived at Atsugi Air Base in Japan to begin the occupation of Japan by the Allied Powers.

Last air casualty 
On August 18, Japanese pilots attacked two B-32s of the 386th Bombardment Squadron and 312th Bombardment Group on a photo reconnaissance mission over Japan. Sergeant Anthony Marchione, 19, a photographer's assistant, was fatally wounded in the attack and would be the last American killed in air combat in the Second World War.

Allied operations after the informal surrender

Troop actions 
On August 18, Soviet troops began invading the Kuril Islands, starting with amphibious landings in Shumshu. Five days later, the last Japanese troops there surrendered. On August 30, after the informal surrender, British forces returned to Hong Kong.
 August 27, 1945 B-29s begin to drop supplies to prisoners in Japanese camps as part of Operation "Blacklist", which included providing Allied prisoners of war with adequate supplies and care and to evacuate them from their prisons.
 August 29, 1945 A B-29 was shot down over Korea supplying P.O.W.s in the camp of Konan. Bill Streifer and Irek Sabitov argue the Soviets shot the plane down to prevent the Americans from identifying facilities supporting Japan's atomic bomb program.
 September 2, 1945 Formal Japanese surrender ceremony aboard  in Tokyo Bay; U.S. President Harry S. Truman declares Victory over Japan Day.

Aftermath

 September 2, 1945 Japanese garrison in Penang surrenders, while the British begin to retake Penang under Operation Jurist.
 September 4, 1945 Japanese troops on Wake Island surrender.
 September 5, 1945 The British land in Singapore.
 September 5, 1945 The Soviets complete their occupation of the Kuril Islands.
 September 6, 1945 Japanese forces in Rabaul and across Papua New Guinea surrender.
 September 8, 1945 MacArthur enters Tokyo.
 September 8, 1945 US forces land at Incheon to occupy Korea south of the 38th parallel.
 September 9, 1945 Japanese forces in China surrender.
 September 9, 1945 Japanese forces on the Korean Peninsula surrender.
 September 10, 1945 Japanese forces in Borneo surrender.
 September 10, 1945 Japanese in Labuan surrender.
 September 11, 1945 Japanese in Sarawak surrender.
 September 12, 1945 Japanese in Singapore formally surrender.
 September 13, 1945 Japanese in Burma formally surrender.
 September 16, 1945 Japanese in Hong Kong formally surrender.
 October 25, 1945 Japanese in Taiwan surrender to Generalissimo Chiang Kai-shek.

Thailand (Siam)
After Japan's defeat in 1945, most of the international community, with the exception of Britain, did not accept Thailand's declaration of war, as it had been signed under duress. Thailand was not occupied by the Allies, but it was forced to return the territory it had regained to the French. In the postwar period Thailand had relations with the United States, which it saw as a protector from the communist revolutions in neighbouring countries.

Occupation of Japan
At the end of World War II, Japan was occupied by the Allies, led by the United States with contributions also from Australia, India, New Zealand and the United Kingdom. This foreign presence marked the first time in its history that the island nation had been occupied by a foreign power. The San Francisco Peace Treaty, signed on September 8, 1951, marked the end of the Allied occupation, and after it came into force on April 28, 1952, Japan was once again an independent country.

International Military Tribunal for the Far East

During the occupation of Japan, leading Japanese war crime charges were reserved for those who participated in a joint conspiracy to start and wage war, termed "Class A" (crimes against peace), and were brought against those in the highest decision-making bodies; "Class B" crimes were reserved for those who committed "conventional" atrocities or crimes against humanity; "Class C" crimes were reserved for those in "the planning, ordering, authorization, or failure to prevent such transgressions at higher levels in the command structure."

Twenty-eight Japanese military and political leaders were charged with Class A crimes, and more than 5,500 others were charged with Class B and C crimes, as lower-ranking war criminals. The Republic of China held 13 tribunals of its own, resulting in 504 convictions and 149 executions.

Emperor Hirohito and all members of the imperial family such as Prince Asaka, were not prosecuted for involvement in any the three categories of crimes. Herbert Bix explains that "the Truman administration and General MacArthur both believed the occupation reforms would be implemented smoothly if they used Hirohito to legitimise their changes."  As many as 50 suspects, such as Nobusuke Kishi, who later became Prime Minister were charged but released without ever being brought to trial in 1947 and 1948. Shiro Ishii received immunity in exchange for data gathered from his experiments on live prisoners. The lone dissenting judge to exonerate all indictees was Indian jurist Radhabinod Pal.

The tribunal was adjourned on November 12, 1948.

See also
 Timeline of Axis surrenders in World War II
 Japanese holdout
 Aftermath of World War II

References

Pacific Ocean theatre of World War II
1945 in military history
1945 in Asia
World War II operations and battles of the Southeast Asia Theatre
South West Pacific theatre of World War II
Japan campaign
Chronology of World War II